Tobey Black is a Canadian punk rock and indie rock musician. She has been a guitarist and vocalist for the Vancouver bands Maow and The Gay.

References

Year of birth missing (living people)
Living people
Musicians from Vancouver
Canadian punk rock guitarists
Canadian women guitarists
Canadian punk rock singers
Canadian women singers
Canadian indie rock musicians